The Brookhaven School District is a public school district based in Brookhaven, Mississippi (USA).

In 2019 it had 2,800 students, with 65% being African-American.

In 2019 the district allowed parents to ask for specific teachers, a "parental request" system with black and white parents actively using it. As a result there are elementary classrooms that are majority white and some that are all black, which Adam Northam of The Clarion-Ledger states is a de facto racial segregation system.

Schools
Brookhaven High School (Grades 9-12)
Alexander Junior High School (Grades 7-8)
Lipsey Middle School (Grades 5-6)
Brookhaven Elementary School (Grades 3-4)
Mamie Martin Elementary School (Grades K-2)
Fannie Mullins Alternative School

Demographics

2006-07 school year
There were a total of 3,050 students enrolled in the Brookhaven School District during the 2006–2007 school year. The gender makeup of the district was 50% female and 50% male. The racial makeup of the district was 61.61% African American, 37.34% White, 0.43% Hispanic, 0.59% Asian, and 0.03% Native American. 56.9% of the district's students were eligible to receive free lunch.

Previous school years

Accountability statistics

See also
List of school districts in Mississippi

References

External links
 

Education in Lincoln County, Mississippi
School districts in Mississippi